Van der Waals or Van der Waal may refer to:

People
 Fransje van der Waals (born 1950), Dutch medical physician
 Grace VanderWaal (born 2004), American singer-songwriter
 Henk van der Waal (born 1960), Dutch poet
 Joan van der Waals (1920–2022), Dutch physicist
 Johannes Diderik van der Waals (1837–1923), Dutch physicist
  (1912–1950), Dutch spy,  in German service during World War II (see Dutch resistance)

Physics
There are a series of subjects named after Johannes Diderik van der Waals:
 Van der Waals force
 Van der Waals equation
 Van der Waals molecule
 Van der Waals radius
 Van der Waals surface

Other uses
 Van der Waals (crater), named after the physicist
 Mona Vanderwaal, Pretty Little Liars character

See also
Van der Wal, surname